The U.S. Highways in Montana are the segments of the United States Numbered Highway System owned and maintained by the Montana Department of Transportation (MDT) in the U.S. state of Montana.



Mainline highways

Special routes

See also

References

External links

 
U.S. Highways